David Alers (born 9 July 1956) is a South African cricketer. He played in one List A and nine first-class matches from 1976/77 to 1981/82.

References

External links
 

1956 births
Living people
South African cricketers
Border cricketers
Eastern Province cricketers
Rhodesia cricketers
Sportspeople from Gweru